João Pessoa may refer to:

 João Pessoa (politician) (1878 – 1930), governor of Paraíba, Brazil
 João Pessoa, Paraíba, state capital of Paraíba, named after the governor
 João Pessoa Airport (Presidente Castro Pinto International Airport), serving João Pessoa, Paraíba, Brazil
 Coronel João Pessoa, a town in Rio Grande do Norte, Brazil
 Vila João Pessoa, Porto Alegre, a neighborhood in the city of Porto Alegre, Brazil